Nina Fiore is an American TV and film writer as well as producer. She has written for Eureka (2006), Alphas (2014), The Vampire Diaries, Nancy Drew and the Hidden Staircase, and The Handmaid's Tale (2017). For her work on The Handmaid's Tale, Fiore won the 2018 Writers Guild of America Award for Television: New Series and WGA Dramatic Series, as well receiving the nomination for the 2019 72nd Primetime Emmy Awards for Outstanding Drama Series.

Career 
Fiore was a writer for The Handmaid's Tale (2017-2019). She wrote for the show when it won for the Primetime Emmy Award for Outstanding Drama Series and Outstanding Writing for a Drama Series, as well as the Golden Globe Award for Best Television Series – Drama.

Fiore is developing a new series for Freeform titled Dante's Inferno.

Filmography

Television

Film

References

External links

Living people
American television writers
American television producers
Writers Guild of America Award winners
Year of birth missing (living people)
American screenwriters
American women television writers
Television producers from California
Screenwriters from California
21st-century American women